Mishil (c. 546/548 – c. 612) was a Silla aristocrat whose historicity is debated. According to the Hwarang Segi, she was concubine to several kings and, along with his mother Queen Sado, played an instrumental role in dethroning King Jinji.

Biography
According to the Hwarang Segi, Mishil was the daughter of Lord Mijinbu and Lady Myodo, a sister of Queen Sado, the consort of Jinheung of Silla. Her paternal grandmother was Princess Samyeop, daughter of King Beopheung. Matrilineally, she belonged to the Matrilineal clan of Daewon Shintong (대원신통, 大元神統）or directly translated as the divine succession of the great prime. The Daewon Shintong is believed to be descent from Bomi, however, the records in the reigns of Soji of Silla, that Bomi, the Lady Daewon (大元夫人）, passed away and buried at the age of 82. Lady Daewon has given birth to 12 children from several different fathers. Because of her nobility, her descendants were known as Daewon or great prime tribe. (大元族）.

She was the wife of Lord Sejong (the sixth Pungwolju), the lover of General Seolwon (the seventh Pungwolju) and the older sister of Lord Misaeng (the tenth Pungwolju). She was concubine to three successive Silla kings: King Jinheung, King Jinji, and King Jinpyeong. Legend states that she was in love with Crown Prince Dongnyeon. Her sons became the 11th and 16th pungwoljus, Hajong (through Sejong) and Bojong (through Seolwon), respectively.

According to Hwarang Segi: Mishil became King Jinji's concubine after his father, King Jinheung died. However, he lost interest on her after falling in love with another woman. His mother, Queen Sado, was angered about his sudden change of heart and failing to keep his promise on making her sister’s daughter, Mishil into his Queen.

As a result, Queen Sado, with the help of Mishil's lovers; Lord Sejong and General Seolwon, managed to get the support of the court to dethrone King Jinji. They gained people's support after blaming him for the starvation and defeat that Silla has suffered by spreading the rumor that heavens has forsaken Silla for having an immoral king. Jinji's removal resulted in the installation of his nephew, King Jinpyeong, to the throne. Jinji's grandson, Kim Chunchu, would later succeed to the throne as King Muyeol.

Historicity
It has been questioned whether Misil was truly a historical figure, as she is only mentioned in the Hwarang Segi, and not in the historical texts Samguk sagi or Samguk yusa. Additionally, her role as mother to her various sons and daughters is not acknowledged by either of these historical texts, only the Hwarang Segi.

In popular culture
Portrayed by Seo Kap-sook in 2006-2007 SBS TV series Yeon Gaesomun.
Portrayed by Go Hyun-jung and Uee in the 2009 MBC TV series Queen Seondeok.

Genealogy

Ancestors

Family
For the lineage from Mishil's parents upwards, refer to the ancestry chart above
Younger Brother: Misaeng Rang (美生郞 미생랑), 10th Pungwolju
Husbands and Lovers, and their Respective Issue:
 Lord Sejong (世宗公 세종공, ?–588), 6th Pungwolju (561-568, 572)
 Lord Hajong (夏宗公 하종공, 564–?), 1st son, 11th Pungwolju (588–591)
 Lord Okjong (玉宗公 옥종공), 2nd son by Lord Sejong
 Lord Sadaham (斯多含公 사다함공, 546–564), 5th Pungwolju (562-564) – No issue.
 Seolwon Rang (薛原郞 설원랑, 549–606), 7th Pungwolju (572–579)
 Lord Bojong (寶宗公 보종공, 580–621), Only son, 16th Pungwolju (616–621)
 King Jinheung (眞興王 진흥왕), 24th King of Silla
 Prince Sujong (壽宗殿君 수종전군), Only son
 Princess Banya (般若公主 반야공주), 1st daughter
 Princess Nanya (蘭若公主 난야공주), 2nd daughter
 Crown Prince Dongryun (銅輪太子 동륜태자, ?–572), son of King Jinheung
 Princess Aesong (艾松公主 애송공주), Only daughter
 King Jinji (眞智王 진지왕), 25th King of Silla – No issue.
 King Jinpyeong (眞平王 진평왕), 26th King of Silla
 Princess Bohwa (寶華公主 보화공주), Only daughter

Notes

6th-century Korean women
6th-century women
Korean concubines
Korean women in politics
Royal consorts of Silla
People whose existence is disputed
Silla people
Silla Buddhists